The Nubian Desert is in the eastern region of the Sahara Desert, spanning approximately 400,000 km2 of northeastern Sudan and northern Eritrea, between the Nile and the Red Sea. The arid region is rugged and rocky and contains some dunes, it also contains many wadis that die out before reaching the Nile.

The native inhabitants of the area are the Nubians. The River Nile goes through most of its cataracts while traveling through the Nubian Desert. This is right before the Great Bend of the Nile. The Nubian Desert affected the civilization in ancient Egypt in many ways.
Merchants and traders from ancient Egypt would travel over the Nubian Desert to buy gold, cloth, stone, food, and much more from the ancient civilization of Nubia.

The largest city of the Nubian Desert is Port Sudan, located on the eastern end of the desert, on the Red Sea. Other important cities of the Nubian Desert are Atbara on the river of the same name, as well as Massawa on the Red Sea. The town of Abidiya is located on the Nile river.

This desert is the only habitat for the critically endangered palm Medemia argun, which only appears rarely in some oases in the desert.

On October 7, 2008 the meteoroid 2008 TC3 exploded above the Nubian Desert. The sky became so bright, people hundreds of miles away reported seeing the flash.

References

Deserts of Eritrea
Deserts of Sudan
Nubia
Sahara